The Buddhist Temple of Chicago (BTC) was founded in October 1944 by Gyomay Kubose, a minister of the Higashi Honganji branch of the Jōdo Shinshū ("True Pure Land School") sect, along with several laypeople who had been released from the Japanese American internment camps. Although the temple is administratively independent, the teaching lineage reflects the progressive Jōdo Shinshū thought of Manshi Kiyozawa and his student, Haya Akegarasu, who was Kubose's teacher.

The temple was originally called the Chicago Buddhist Church and was located in the Hyde Park neighborhood on Chicago's south side. In the mid-1950s, the temple relocated to the Uptown neighborhood on the north side.

In 2006, the temple dedicated its new building.

The membership base continues to be Japanese American, but from early in the temple's history the number of non-Japanese members has steadily increased. Today the active membership includes a diversity of Asian, European, Latino and African ethnicities.

See also
Buddhism in the United States

References

External links 
 

Buddhist temples in Illinois
Religious buildings and structures in Chicago
20th-century Buddhist temples